Ninad Vaidya (born 3 September 1981) is an Indian film/television producer. Ninad Vaidya is a partner in Dashami Creations LLP, which creates television content, and of Dashami Studioz LLP, which produces films and digital Content.

Early life 

Ninad started his career post his graduation from BSC in Mathematics.  Initially, he was working as an Associate Producer and Executive producer till the year 2004. Later in 2005, he joined Chrome Pictures Pvt. Ltd. as a Producer. He worked in Chrome pictures for five years till 2010. In his tenure of Five years in Chrome Pictures, and produced several Commercials and Advertising campaigns. In October 2012, Vaidya started Dashami Creations LLP.

Career 
Ninad worked as associate producer / executive producer until 2004. In 2005 he joined Chrome Pictures Pvt. Ltd. as a producer. He worked at Chrome pictures until 2010.  While there he produced several commercials/advertising campaigns.

Dashami Studioz LLP 
The first feature film that Vaidya co-produced was Ghantaa, by Shailesh Shankar Kale, starring Amey Wagh, [[ Aroh Welankar, Saksham Kulkarni, Anuja Sathe, Pushkar Shrotri, and Kishor Kadam. It was released on 14 October 2016. 

Muramba was released on June 2, 2017. It was directed by Varun Narvekar and starred Mithila Palkar and Amey Wagh.  It was screened in the Panorama section of International Film Festival of India (IFFI) in 2017. Muramba won 6 awards at Jio Filmfare Marathi for Best Actor in a Leading Role (Male) to Amey Wagh, Best Actor in a Supporting Role (Female) to Chinmayee Sumeet, Best Debut( Female) to Mithila Palkar, Best Dialogues to Varun Narvekar, Best Playback Singer (Female) to Anuradha Kuber and Best Debut Director to Varun Narvekar.  It won 2nd Best Film award in the Maharashtra State Film Awards 2017, and Zee Gaurav Puraskar 2018 for Best Film, Best Music, Best Playback Singer (Male) Best Story and Best Screenplay.

Dashami Creations LLP 
The lists of TV shows produced by Dashami and Ninad Vaidya.

 
The lists of movies produced by Dashami and Ninad Vaidya.

References

External links 
 

1981 births
Living people
Film producers from Mumbai

2021-present Punyashlok Ahilyabai